Vanessa O'Connell is an editor at Reuters and co-author of Wheelmen: Lance Armstrong, the Tour de France, and the Greatest Sports Conspiracy Ever. O'Connell previously worked as a reporter, writing award-winning stories on markets, business, legal and investigative topics at The Wall Street Journal. She also was part of the team of journalists behind a 2013 documentary featuring successful entrepreneurs including Sir Richard Branson, Carly Fiorina, and will.i.am.

Awards

 2011 Gerald Loeb Award for Large Newspapers for the story "Deep Trouble"

References

1969 births
Living people
American non-fiction writers
American women journalists
Gerald Loeb Award winners for Large Newspapers
21st-century American women